Gilbert Lynch (died 1 November 1969) was an Irish Labour Party politician and trade union official. He was elected to Dáil Éireann as a Labour Party Teachta Dála (TD) for the Galway constituency at the June 1927 general election. He lost his seat at the September 1927 general election having only served 3 months as a TD.

He served as president of the Irish Trades Union Congress in 1945.

References

Year of birth missing
1969 deaths
Labour Party (Ireland) TDs
Irish trade unionists
Members of the 5th Dáil
Politicians from County Galway